Iranrud (Persian: ایران‌رود) which means Iran River in Persian, was a plan to build a canal from the Caspian Sea to the Persian Gulf or the Gulf of Oman. The former Soviet Union was eager to realize this project because its only warm water ports led to the Strait of Istanbul and the Dardanelles, which were under the control of Turkey, a NATO country.

There were two different proposals for the route of the canal:
 directly to the Indian Ocean through Dasht-e Lut, or;
 from the Caspian to Lake Urmia and after that to the Persian Gulf.

History
The idea of linking the two coasts via Iranian territory was first introduced in the 19th century. The first professional study was carried out in the 1960s.

First time this plan has been written by Humaan Farzad in 1968. According to his plan some lake must be made between Persian gulf and Oman sea. Three places were suggested: Jazmurian pit and two other places in Dasht-e Lut and Dasht-e Kavir.

Many years later same plan was suggested to Mir-Hossein Mousavi, who was prime minister at that time.

Routes
The western route: roughly following the shortest air distance between the two coasts, extends over a total length of about 950 km from the northern end of the Persian Gulf to the southwest of the Caspian Sea. The channel would go south in Arvand Rud and Karun (≈300 km), and in the north by Sefid Rud (≈50 km). The mentioned river basin was partially navigable and it would be necessary to regulate the flow. In the central part, the channel would stretch through a high mountain valley with a length of about 600 km. The main advantages of the western route are the shorter distance between the seas, the passage through the Khuzestan and Guilan lowlands, the partial flow of rivers, the possibility of using more artificial lakes, and easier water supply for the damp climate and numerous watercourses. However, the major disadvantage of this route is the passage through the chains of Zagros and Alborz, especially in the Kurdistan and Hamadan provinces, where the altitude of the route would inevitably need to climb to more than 1800 meters. The Western route was mentioned solely as an option and no more detailed studies were carried out for it that specialists give a big advantage to a more flexible eastern route.
Eastern route: stretches from the shores of the Gulf of Oman to the southeast coast of the Caspian Sea, totaling between 1465 and 1600 km. This passage was first proposed by Engineer H. Farzad in 1966, and provides for channeling through the depression of Hamun-Dzaz-Murjan, Dašt-e Lut and Dašt-e Kavira. By the late 1990s, Iranian engineers for the ultimate southern destination had planned the area of Bandar Abas, more specifically the Minab Valley, and then the route shifted eastward to the Macau valleys of the Kašan River in Džaskanski or Kahir in Čabaharský okrug. The Russian experts, in 2000s, independent of the Iranian, elaborated preliminary plans for the massive transitional channel, also saw Bandar Abas as the terminus. The valleys of both of these rivers intersect Bašakerd's mass and lead to Hamun-Džaz-Murjan, the southernmost part of the Iranska plateau or depression whose eastern and northern boundary zones are foreseen for the route is about 600 m n. v. The channel would pass through the area around Iranhahera, and one of its important sources of supply would be the Bampur River.

Targets
In addition to reaching open waters, there were more reasons to build this canal.

First plan
Passing river through Lut would cause water to reach its thirsty grounds.

Second plan
According to critical fall in Lake Urmia's water levels, this plan could bring enough water to this lake.

See also
 International North–South Transport Corridor
 Eurasia Canal
 Iranian plateau
 Lake Urmia

References

Canals in Iran
Proposed buildings and structures in Iran
Proposed canals